Green Lakes State Park is a New York State Park located east of Syracuse in the Town of Manlius. The park is strikingly scenic, and has a "masterpiece" golf course designed by Robert Trent Jones very early in his career. Green Lake itself is perhaps the most studied meromictic lake—one in which layers of water do not mix—in the world. The park preserves the largest stand of old growth forest in Central New York, and Round Lake has been designated as a National Natural Landmark by the U.S. Department of the Interior.

The park is centered on two small lakes, Green Lake and Round Lake, which have an unusual blue-green color. These lakes lie at the base of a gorge that is somewhat longer than a mile in length. The lakes and the gorge are remnants of the ice ages, and exemplify some of the unusual geology of upstate New York. Green Lake has a surface area of 65 acres and a maximum depth of 195 feet. Round Lake has a surface area of 34 acres and a maximum depth of 170 feet.

Nearly half the park's area is old-growth forest, which includes many very large specimens of tuliptrees, sugar maples, beech, basswood, hemlocks, and white cedars. A grove of trees, lying immediately to the southwest of Round Lake, has been called the Tuliptree Cathedral.

Camping and recreation
At its northern end, Green Lake has a sandy swimming beach, lawns for sunbathing, and a building with changing facilities and a concession stand; Green Lake is certainly one of the most popular swimming beaches in Central New York. Adjacent to the beach, there is a boathouse with rowboat and paddleboat rentals in the summer season. Currently, Green Lakes is offering stand up paddle board classes, excursions, and yoga taught by Method 360; privately owned boats and paddle boards are not permitted. The park has an 18-hole golf course designed by Robert Trent Jones, as well as a clubhouse in its southeastern quadrant. Above the western cliffs along Green Lake there are a Frisbee golf course, 137 campsites, and seven cabins for those who prefer a less rustic experience and some outdoors life experience. There are several formal picnic areas throughout the park, including some with picnic shelters that can be reserved for groups.

Some of the trails are also available for mountain biking. The development of the lake area is mostly contained at its northern end. The western shoreline of Green Lake is undeveloped, and Round Lake itself is essentially in wilderness. Of this region, Mary Notarthomas has written that "When walking on the lake trails, one is cradled between the rich, vibrant, almost alien blue-green waters on one side and thickly vegetated, steep wooded inclines on the other."

The park includes many bike trails, most of which are at the western edge of the park. These connect with the Old Erie Canal State Historic Park, which runs by the north entrance to Green Lakes State Park (just above the top of the aerial photograph). The Erie Canal, which was abandoned in 1918, is still continuous within this State Historic Park, and the old towpath is now a walking and bicycling path. The Park extends  from the Butternut Creek aqueduct in DeWitt to the Erie Canal Village, which is near Rome.

Golf course
Green Lakes State Park has an 18-hole public golf course designed by Robert Trent Jones in 1935. The course was one of Trent Jones' earliest; ultimately, he was credited with designing about 500 courses. In lieu of payment for its design, he was given a ten-year lease for $1.00/year. Jones opened the course on May 6, 1936. He'd invited Gene Sarazen to play an exhibition match with Emmett Kelly, the first course pro; more than 1,000 people came to watch.

James Dodson has written of the course that "the original little masterpiece at Green Lakes, where Wendy and I and sometimes the other Dewsweepers slipped away to chase the game among the gloriously mature evergreens and admire the long view over a dark blue glacial lake, to the very foothills of the Adirondacks themselves, remained just about my favorite Trent Jones golf course of all." Trent Jones attended the 50th anniversary of the opening of the course in 1986.

History and planning
The movement to acquire the land around Green Lakes for a state park began around 1924. The history has been described in a memoir by Betsy Knapp. Knapp, a descendant of the family that acquired and farmed this area in the early 19th century, noted the particular role of Harry Francis, then a professor at the New York State College of Forestry at Syracuse University (now the State University of New York College of Environmental Science and Forestry).

In October 1927  were purchased for the new park. In 1929, the Administration Building was built according to plans by Laurie D. Cox, a prominent landscape architect (and Hall of Fame lacrosse coach) who was active in the design of several New York state parks. The first superintendent of the park, Arvin Henry Almquist, lived there for four years. The building, which had been boarded up for many years, was re-opened in 2008.

During the Great Depression (1929–1939), the New York State Department of Conservation (under the administration of then-governor Franklin Delano Roosevelt) and later the Civilian Conservation Corps (CCC) constructed the park's roads, buildings, cabins, golf course and trails. CCC camps for project SP-12 were created on the property of the park. CCC company 1203, and subsequently 2211 (a company of veterans of the 1898 Spanish–American War), were assigned to the project. These men hauled loads of sand from Sylvan Beach (on nearby Oneida Lake) to create a sandy beach; they dug the basements of the park buildings by hand. The CCC also constructed barracks, dining halls, etc. for its own use. These facilities were closed in 1941. A reunion of the CCC companies who had worked in Central New York was held at Green Lakes in 1988.

The CCC camp was reopened in 1944 during World War II to house wartime farm workers from Newfoundland. In 1945 it became the Fayetteville Camp for German prisoners of war. Fayetteville Camp was a branch of Pine Camp, which was located on the site of the present Fort Drum near Watertown, New York. The camp was closed again in 1946 when the prisoners were repatriated to Germany.

There were additional acquisitions of land in 1960, 1975, 1995, and 1996. Plans to add an additional  to the park have apparently been frustrated. 261 additional acres were acquired in 2019. Alverna Heights, a 200-acre retreat adjoining the park, was purchased from the Sisters of St. Francis by New York State on December 6, 2019. Two houses occupied by the Sisters have been leased back to them for a decade.

In 2008, the bathhouse near the park's swimming area and beach was demolished, and a new building was constructed to replace it at a cost of about $2.3 million. The building incorporates changing facilities, restrooms and showers, a snack concession, and a meeting room.

2011 Master Plan and Environmental Impact Statement
On March 23, 2011 the State's Office of Parks, Recreation and Historic Preservation published a "Final Master Plan/Final Environmental Impact Statement for Green Lakes State Park". The Executive Summary of the Plan notes:

 1002 acres in the western half of the park is designated as a Bird Conservation Area.
 Approximately 105 acres in the Old Growth area within the National Natural Landmark, and the area surrounding Round Lake, is designated as a Park Preservation Area
 Improve the Rolling Hills Campground in the short term. In the long term the campground will be relocated to an area south of the park office.

While the large white-tail deer population in the park is a problem, bow hunting is excluded; some local groups have called for bow-hunting of deer in the park as a partial solution.

Geology and limnology

Origin of the gorge
There is thus nearly  gouged out of the bedrock here.

This deep gorge was formed towards the end of the last ice age, about 15,000 years ago, by an enormous river of water. The river originated in the melting, retreating ice sheet, and it flowed east through this channel on its way to the sea. Geologists call these gorges and hollows "the Syracuse channels."

Origin of the lakes
Green Lake and Round Lake are probably the remnants of the "plunge pools" of enormous waterfalls that existed during this era. However, the presence of two distinct lakes is not fully understood. As expected for plunge pools, the lakes are fairly deep in comparison to their area.

The color of the lakes

Nearly half of the water that enters the lakes comes directly through the bedrock in which the lakes are embedded. This water contains a heavy load of dissolved minerals that are not present in water that enters through the surface from rain and snow. The high concentration of sulfur in the deep waters had already been reported by 1849; the lakes' waters also have a high concentration of calcium and magnesium. This mineral concentration leads to "whiting" events each year in which small crystallites of calcite and other minerals precipitate from the water. At these times of year the lakes appear particularly green, and the small crystallites are deposited in a layer underneath the lakes' waters. The notable shoreline "reef" at Deadman's Point (see photo) on Green Lake was built up by this precipitation over thousands of years. Underneath Deadman's Point there are some extremely rare aquatic mosses and sponges.

Climate history and Green Lakes
Nearly all lakes undergo mixing of their deepest waters with their surface waters at least once a year.  This mixing does not occur for Green Lake and Round Lake. They are rare, meromictic lakes. Waters deeper than about 55 feet (18 m) do not mix with the surface waters; as a consequence, they are essentially devoid of oxygen, and are rich in calcium, magnesium, and sulfur. The meromictic character of the lakes is due both to their relative depth compared to their area, and to the influx of mineral rich ground waters.

Because of this lack of physical mixing, as well as the absence of growing plants or crawling animals in their oxygen-depleted depths, the deep bottoms of the lakes have relatively undisturbed annual layers of sediment (or varves) that preserve a historical record, somewhat like tree rings do. These varves are being used to study the climate of this area of New York over the last several thousand years.

References

External links

New York State Parks: Green Lakes State Park, official State of New York website for the park with contact and camping reservation information.
Green Lakes State Park Golf Course webpage with contact information, times and fees.

"The Underwater World of Green Lakes", video obtained using a robotic submarine by Dr. Mark A. Teece.
Photographs by Matthew Conheady at Green Lakes State Park.
CNY Heritage Digital Library, featuring photographs taken by Arvin H. Almquist, the original superintendent of Green Lakes State Park, during the park's development (1929–1948).

State parks of New York (state)
Campgrounds in New York (state)
Golf clubs and courses designed by Robert Trent Jones
Golf clubs and courses in New York (state)
Civilian Conservation Corps in New York (state)
Parks in Onondaga County, New York
Golf in Syracuse, New York
Sports venues in Onondaga County, New York
Manlius, New York
1928 establishments in New York (state)
Protected areas established in 1928
Old-growth forests